The Nepal national women's handball team is the national handball team of Nepal and is controlled by the Nepal Handball Association (NHA).

Current squad
The following 16 player squad was selected by the Nepal Handball Association for the 2019 South Asian Games.

Head Coach:

Tournament history

South Asian Games
2016 : 4th
2019 :

South Asian Women's Handball Championship

 2008: 4th
 2013 : 
 2018:

External links

IHF profile

References

Handball in Nepal
Women's national handball teams
Handball